Athletics events were contested at the 1967 Summer Universiade in Tokyo, Japan.

Medal summary

Men

Women

Medal table

References
World Student Games (Universiade - Men) - GBR Athletics
World Student Games (Universiade - Women) - GBR Athletics

Athletics at the Summer Universiade
Uni
1967 Summer Universiade
1967 Universiade